Madita Kohorst  (born 14 October 1996) is a German handball player for TuS Metzingen and the German national team.

She was selected as part of the German team for the 2017 World Women's Handball Championship.

References

External links

 

1996 births
Living people
Sportspeople from Lower Saxony
German female handball players